Tambulig, officially the Municipality of Tambulig (Subanen: Benwa Tambulig; Chavacano: Municipalidad de Tambulig), is a 4th class municipality in the province of Zamboanga del Sur, Philippines. According to the 2020 census, it has a population of 37,480 people.

Geography

Barangays
Tambulig is politically subdivided into 31 barangays.

Climate

Demographics

Economy

References

External links
 Tambulig Profile at PhilAtlas.com
 [ Philippine Standard Geographic Code]
Philippine Census Information

Municipalities of Zamboanga del Sur